Bustamite is a calcium manganese inosilicate (chain silicate) and a member of the wollastonite group. Magnesium, zinc and iron are common impurities substituting for manganese. Bustamite is the high-temperature polymorph of CaMnSi2O6 and johannsenite is the low temperature polymorph.

Cell parameters
There is considerable variety in the literature about the size and type of the unit cell, the formula to be used, and the value of Z, the number of formula units per unit cell.

Bustamite is a triclinic mineral, which could be described by a primitive unit cell, but the larger A-centered cell is often preferred, in order to facilitate comparison with the similar mineral wollastonite.

The formula for bustamite is  but it is sometimes written , and changing the formula in this way will change the value of Z. The structure is chains of SiO4 tetrahedra with repeat unit of three tetrahedra, unlike the pyroxenes where the repeat unit is two. Ca++ and Mn++ are positioned between the chains. There are 12 tetrahedra in the A-centered unit cell.

The unit cell, the formula and Z cannot be taken separately; they are interlinked and form a consistent set of values. This article adopts the A-centred unit cell (space group A) with a = 7.736 Å, b = 7.157 Å and c = 13.824 Å, the formula  and Z = 6. Deer et al. take the formula as  so their value of Z is doubled to 12. Mindat apparently gives the lattice parameters for a face-centred cell, although they give the space group as P.

Type locality
The type locality was originally taken as Tetela de Jonotla, Puebla, Mexico, and the mineral was named for the Mexican mineralogist and botanist Miguel Bustamante y Septiem (1790–1844). The material from Puebla, however, was later found to be a mixture of johannsenite and rhodonite, so the type locality is now the Franklin Mine, Franklin, Sussex County, New Jersey, US.

Both bustamite and johansennite are found at Franklin. Bustamite is moderately common there and occurs in a variety of assemblages, associated with rhodonite and tephroite, calcite and tephroite or glaucochroite and tephroite. Vesuvianite, wollastonite, garnet, diopside, willemite, johannsenite, margarosanite and clinohedrite also may be present.

Environment
Bustamite typically results from metamorphism of manganese-bearing sediments, with attendant metasomatism. At the (new) type locality, Franklin, the oldest rocks are Precambrian gneisses of mixed sedimentary and volcanic origin. Franklin Marble was deposited within these rocks, along with sediments containing zinc, manganese and iron minerals. These sediments were metamorphosed later in the Precambrian, then the rocks were uplifted from the late Precambrian into the Cambrian and quartzite was deposited on the eroded surface. In Cambrian-Ordovician time the quartzite was in turn overlain by limestone, and the rocks have been subject to uplift and erosion up to the present time.

References

External links

Inosilicates
Triclinic minerals
Minerals in space group 2